Hadley Wood railway station is in the London Borough of Enfield in north London, England.

History
The station was opened on 1 May 1885 by the Great Northern Railway (GNR). The station was completely reconstructed in 1959 for the increase from two to four tracks through the station.

Facilities

There is a Shere self-service ticket machine at the station entrance, installed in Autumn 2008 and replacing the previous (Avantix) machine.

Oyster cards can be used at this station.

Services
All services at Hadley Wood are operated by Great Northern using  EMUs.

The typical off-peak service in trains per hour is:
 2 tph to 
 2 tph to 

During the peak hours, the service is increased to 4 tph in each direction.

Late evening and weekend services used to run to and from  rather than Moorgate, but from 13 December 2015 Great Northern introduced a weekend service on the line and extended evening hours until the end of service.

Connections
London Buses route 399 serves the station.

References

External links

 Timetables for Hadley Wood via Archive.org

Railway stations in the London Borough of Enfield
DfT Category E stations
Former Great Northern Railway stations
Railway stations in Great Britain opened in 1885
Railway stations served by Govia Thameslink Railway
Hadley Wood